Indian Creek is a stream in the Carroll County, Arkansas and Stone County, Missouri.

Indian Creek was so named on account of Delaware settlement in the area.

See also
List of rivers of Arkansas
List of rivers of Missouri

References

Rivers of Carroll County, Arkansas
Rivers of Arkansas
Rivers of Stone County, Missouri
Rivers of Missouri